The Hollies: 20 Golden Greats is a compilation album by The Hollies, CDP 7 46238 2, produced in 1978 by EMI by Ron Richards. The album cover's subtitle is "20 great sounds that grew out of the North." The album peaked at No. 2 in the UK albums chart.

Track listing
 "The Air That I Breathe"
 "Carrie Anne"
 "Bus Stop"
 "Listen To Me"
 "Look Through Any Window"
 "I Can't Let Go"
 "Long Cool Woman In A Black Dress"
 "Here I Go Again"
 "I Can't Tell The Bottom From The Top"
 "I'm Alive"
 "Yes I Will"
 "Stay"
 "Sorry Suzanne"
 "Gasoline Alley Bred"
 'We're Through"
 "Jennifer Eccles"
 "Stop Stop Stop"
 "On a Carousel"
 "Just One Look"
 'He Ain't Heavy, He's My Brother"

References

The Hollies compilation albums
1978 greatest hits albums
Albums produced by Ron Richards (producer)
EMI Records compilation albums